Dimitra Panteliadou is a Greek football striker currently playing in the Greek Championship for Aris Thessaloniki,.>[http://www.uefa.com/teamsandplayers/players/player=67462/profile/index.html She is a member of the Greece national team, playing the 2004 Summer Olympics.

References

1986 births
Living people
Greek women's footballers
Olympic footballers of Greece
Footballers at the 2004 Summer Olympics
Greece women's international footballers
Women's association football forwards
PAOK FC (women) players